Zanclognatha theralis, the noctuid moth, is a species of moth native to North America. It was described by Francis Walker in 1859. It is listed as threatened in the US state of Connecticut.

References

theralis
Moths described in 1859